The 2005–06 Coca-Cola Tigers season was the 4th season of the franchise in the Philippine Basketball Association (PBA).

Key dates
August 14: The 2005 PBA Draft took place in Sta. Lucia East Grand Mall, Cainta, Rizal.

Draft picks

Roster

Fiesta Conference

Game log

|- bgcolor="#edbebf"
| 1
| October 5
| Brgy.Ginebra
| 81–89
| Arigo (22)
| 
| 
| Araneta Coliseum
| 0–1
|- bgcolor="#bbffbb"
| 2
| October 12
| San Miguel
| 79-77
| Mamaril, Carcamo (14)
|  
| 
| Ynares Center
| 1–1
|- bgcolor="#edbebf"
| 3
| October 15
| Sta.Lucia
| 79–89
| Peek (21)
|  
| 
| Lanao del Norte 
| 1–2
|- bgcolor="#edbebf"
| 4
| October 21
| Talk 'N Text
| 81–82
| Arigo (18)
|  
| 
| Araneta Coliseum 
| 1–3
|- bgcolor="#edbebf"
| 5
| October 26
| Purefoods
| 87–103
| Thomas (28)
|  
| 
| Araneta Coliseum 
| 1–4
|- bgcolor="#edbebf"
| 6
| October 28
| Alaska
| 
| 
| 
| 
| Cuneta Astrodome 
| 1–5

|- bgcolor="#bbffbb"
| 7
| November 5
| Red Bull
| 82-64
| Thomas (24)
|  
| 
| Tacloban City 
| 2–5
|- bgcolor="#edbebf"
| 8
| November 9
| Purefoods
| 
| 
|  
| 
| Araneta Coliseum 
| 2–6
|- bgcolor="#bbffbb"
| 9
| November 13
| Alaska
| 86-63
| Thomas (27)
| 
| 
| Araneta Coliseum 
| 3–6
|- bgcolor="#bbffbb"
| 10
| November 19
| Brgy.Ginebra
| 79-67
| 
| 
| 
| Lucena City 
| 4–6
|- bgcolor="#bbffbb"
| 11
| November 23
| Air21
| 115-106 
| Thomas (39)
|  
| 
| Araneta Coliseum 
| 5–6

|- bgcolor="#edbebf"
| 12
| December 9
| San Miguel
| 76–90
| Thomas (23)
|  
| 
| Cuneta Astrodome 
| 5–7
|- bgcolor="#bbffbb"
| 13
| December 11
| Talk 'N Text
| 73-67
| Thomas (24)
| 
| 
| Ynares Center
| 6–7
|- bgcolor="#edbebf"
| 14
| December 16
| Air21
| 94–98
| Thomas (24)
|  
| 
| Cuneta Astrodome 
| 6–8
|- bgcolor="#edbebf"
| 15
| December 18
| Sta.Lucia
| 76–100
| Thomas (29)
|  
| 
| Ynares Center 
| 6–9
|- bgcolor="#edbebf"
| 16
| December 23
| Red Bull
| 77–78
| Arigo (24)
|  
| 
| Cuneta Astrodome 
| 6–10

Transactions

Pre-season

Subtractions
{| cellspacing="0"
| valign="top" |

References

Powerade Tigers seasons
Coca-Cola